Elio Cotena (born 30 August 1945) is an Italian boxer. He competed in the men's featherweight event at the 1968 Summer Olympics. At the 1968 Summer Olympics, he defeated Carl-Axel Palm of Sweden, before losing to Valery Plotnikov of the Soviet Union.

References

External links
 

1945 births
Living people
Italian male boxers
Olympic boxers of Italy
Boxers at the 1968 Summer Olympics
Boxers from Naples
Mediterranean Games gold medalists for Italy
Mediterranean Games medalists in boxing
Competitors at the 1967 Mediterranean Games
Featherweight boxers
20th-century Italian people